Maurice Sunguti (born 6 October 1977) is a Kenya international football striker who has played for clubs in Kenya, Uganda, Sweden, Vietnam and Tanzania.

Career
Born in Kenya, Sunguti began his career with local side AFC Leopards. He left the club in 1997 and became a journeyman, playing professionally in the Superettan with Friska Viljor FC and winning the Tanzanian league twice with Young Africans S.C.

International career
Sunguti represented the senior Kenya national football team from 1997 to 2004. He played at the 2004 African Cup of Nations finals. He also participated at the 2001 CECAFA Cup, scoring a goal against Eritrea.

Honors

Club
AFC Leopards 
Kenyan Premier League
 Champion (1): 1998
SC Villa
Ugandan Premier League
 Champions (2): 2001, 2002
Ugandan Cup
 Champion (1): 2002
Young Africans S.C. (Yanga)
Tanzanian Premier League
 Champions (2): 2007/8, 2008/9

References

External links

1977 births
Living people
Kenyan footballers
Kenyan expatriate footballers
Kenya international footballers
2004 African Cup of Nations players
A.F.C. Leopards players
Express FC players
Tusker F.C. players
Young Africans S.C. players
Superettan players
Association football forwards
Tanzanian Premier League players